Street Scene is a bas-relief sculpture by Marion L. Young installed outside the Chamber of Commerce in Ashland, Oregon, United States. It depicts more than a dozen Shakespearean characters. The artwork was funded by the city's 1988 Downtown Plan, which recommended the installation of fountains and public art in select Ashland locations. Pat Corrigan of the St. Louis Post-Dispatch described the sculpture as "compelling".

References

External links

 
 Street Scene – Ashland, OR at Waymarking

Outdoor sculptures in Ashland, Oregon
Sculptures of men in Oregon
Sculptures of women in Oregon
William Shakespeare